The Acacus Sandstone is a geologic formation in the Ghat District, southwestern Libya. The unit preserves fossils dating back to the Llandovery epoch of the early Silurian period.

Fossil content 

The formation has provided the following fossils:

Trilobites 
 Trilobita indet.

Eurypterids 
 Carcinosoma sp.
 Pterygotus sp.

Invertebrates 
 Mollusca indet.

Ichnofossils 

 Arthrophycus sp.
 Cruziana sp.
 Cubichnia sp.
 Dimorphichnus sp.
 Paleophycus sp.
 Pelecypodichnus sp.
 Rusophycus sp.

See also 

 Fish Bed Formation, Silurian fossiliferous formations of Scotland
 Lipeón Formation, Silurian fossiliferous unit of Bolivia
 Soom Shale, Late Ordovician Lagerstätte of South Africa
 Bertie Formation, Silurian Lagerstätte of Ontario and New York
 Andean-Saharan glaciation

References

Bibliography 
 

Geologic formations of Libya
Silurian System of Africa
Llandovery epoch
Sandstone formations
Shale formations
Shallow marine deposits
Silurian south paleopolar deposits
Fossiliferous stratigraphic units of Africa
Paleontology in Libya
Formations